Shay K. Azoulay is an Israeli writer who writes in English and Hebrew.

Plays
Azoulay's debut play, "The Platoon", a satire about the IDF, won first place in the 2012 staged reading festival "Zav Kriah". The play was staged in Tel Aviv's Tzavtah Theater in 2014-2015 and received good reviews in the press, including a review by prominent theater critic Michael Handelzalts, who compared it to the work of Hanoch Levin. The play also stirred controversy, following an article which mistakenly claimed that the play depicts IDF soldiers raping Palestinian women. A member of the Tel Aviv municipal council sent a letter to the theater, demanding that they stop the staging of the play.
Azoulay's other work includes the one-act play "Shade", which participated in the Tzavtah Theater's 2012 Short play Festival, and "Barabas" - a reimagining of Christopher Marlowe's "The Jew of Malta".

Fiction
Azoulay's debut novel Lazaretto was published in summer 2019 in Hebrew. A review in Haaretz described the novel as “an ambitious, high-tension novel, seeped in paranoia... Lazaretto is a disturbing and stirring dystopia which haunted me while I was reading it and even after I’d finished.” The novel was named "Book of the Year" by LaIsha Magazine which dubbed it "the novel that predicted the pandemic"

Azoulay has also written a series of short stories entitled "Minor Writers of the Entropic Age". These stories include "The Invention of H. P. Lovecraft", published in Flapperhouse Magazine, "The Bard of Hastings" published in The Cost of Paper  and "Permaculture", which won second prize in the 2016 Zoetrope: All-Story short fiction contest.
Also included in this series is "Jacob Wallenstein, Notes for a Future Biography", a work of fiction regarding a "forgotten" Israeli science fiction novelist and his 1,000 page magnum opus. In 2013 Azoulay submitted this story to Tablet magazine, claiming that it was a true account of the nonexistent writer's life and work. An editor at the magazine was initially excited by the story, but eventually discovered that it was a hoax, though he decided to publish the story anyway, together with a forward explaining his discovery of the hoax.

Other short works by Azoulay have appeared in The Molotov Cocktail and McSweeney's Internet Tendency.

Translations
Azoulay also works as a Hebrew to English translator, translating non-fiction, children's literature, and plays, including works by playwright Hanoch Levin.

References

External links
Shay K. Azoulay - official website.
Shay Azoulay on the Israeli Dramatists Website.
Shay Azoulay on The Short Story Project.

1979 births
Living people
Israeli Jews
Israeli novelists
Israeli male dramatists and playwrights
Translators from Hebrew
Literary forgeries
City College of New York alumni